Lord Ed Taylor Hassell (July 16, 1990 – November 1, 2020) was an American actor. His most notable role was the 2013 film Jobs, where he played the young Chris Espinosa.

Life and career 
Born in Corsicana, Texas, Hassell grew up riding in rodeos and after moving to Los Angeles, became a skateboarder, a skill he used in commercials.

He played Phil Nance in ten episodes of the television series Surface, for which he was nominated for the 2006 Young Artist Award.

In 2010, he played Clay in The Kids Are All Right.

In the 2013 film Jobs, he played the young Chris Espinosa; his other film roles included Bomb City in 2017.

Death
Hassell died aged 30 on November 1, 2020, in Grand Prairie, Texas, after being shot in the stomach during what police characterized as a "random robbery". An 18-year-old man was arrested for the murder within days, and in February 2021, he was indicted by a grand jury on capital murder charges.

Filmography

TV series 
 2004: Oliver Beene (1 episode)
 2005–2006: Surface (10 episodes)
 2006–2007: 'Til Death (2 episodes)
 2013: Devious Maids (5 episodes)
 2015: Longmire (episode 4x02)

Films 
 2009: 2012
 2010: The Kids Are All Right
 2011: The Family Tree
 2013: Jobs
 2013: Family Weekend
 2013: House of Dust
 2016: Warrior Road
 2017: Bomb City
 2017: Oh Lucy! (final role)

References

External links 

1990 births
2020 deaths
2020 murders in the United States
21st-century American male actors
American male child actors
American male film actors
American male television actors
Deaths by firearm in Texas
Male actors from Texas
People from Corsicana, Texas
People murdered in Texas